Sheikha Bibi Duaij Al-Jaber Al-Sabah is a migration rights activist and curator from Kuwait. She founded the Social Work Society, which campaigns for the rights of migrant workers, and chairs Sadu House, a textiles museum and cultural centre dedicated to the woven art of Al Sadu.

Career 
Sheikha Bibi Duaij Al-Jaber Al-Sabah was born into the House of Al-Sabah: her parents are Sheikha Altaf Salem Al-Ali and Duaij Jaber Al-Ali, cousins who married in 1971. She studied finance and accounting at university in the early 2000s. In 2005, after graduation, she founded the Social Work Society, an organisation she is also Chair of, which campaigns for the rights of migrant workers. In 2018 she launched the One Roof campaign to advocate for the rights of migrant domestic workers. She is the International Organization for Migration's Goodwill Ambassador for Kuwait and the Gulf Countries. 

Al-Sabah is Chairperson of Sadu House, a museum in Kuwait City which preserves Sadu weaving -  an embroidery form in geometrical shapes hand woven by Bedouin people. She has worked to build a programme which to develop the skills of new weavers for contemporary markets and to develop the concept and acceptance of sadu weaving as a design concept for Kuwait. In 2020 al sadu was listed on UNESCO's list of intangible cultural heritage. To celebrate its inclusion on the listing, Sheikha Bibi organised the projection of coloured lights in sadu patterns onto the walls of Kuwait Towers in 2021.

Awards 
 Arab Woman Awards Kuwait: Entrepreneur (2013).

References

External links 
 Bibi Duaij Al-Jaber Al-Sabah's Youtube channel

Living people
Year of birth missing (living people)
Kuwaiti curators
Kuwaiti women curators
Kuwaiti humanitarians
Kuwaiti activists
Kuwaiti women activists